"When You Put Your Heart in It" is a song recorded by American country music artist Kenny Rogers.  It was released in August 1988 as the first single from the album Something Inside So Strong.  The song reached #26 on the Billboard Hot Country Singles & Tracks chart.  The song was written by Jimmy Dunne and Austin Roberts.  The song was used during the final montage in the official Major League Baseball video of the 1991 World Series between the Minnesota Twins and the Atlanta Braves.

Chart performance

References

1988 singles
1988 songs
Kenny Rogers songs
Songs written by Austin Roberts (singer)
Song recordings produced by Jim Ed Norman
Reprise Records singles
Songs written by Jimmy Dunne (songwriter)